Dance, Dance, Dance may refer to:

Songs
 "Dance, Dance, Dance" (The Beach Boys song), a 1964 song by the Beach Boys
 "Dance, Dance, Dance" (Neil Young song), a song by Neil Young first released by Crazy Horse on their 1971 debut album and covered by The New Seekers in 1972
 "Dance, Dance, Dance" (Yowsah, Yowsah, Yowsah), a 1977 song by Chic
 "Dance Dance Dance" (James Cottriall song), a 2013 song by James Cottriall
 "Dance Dance Dance" (E-girls song), released 2015
 "Dance Dance Dance/My Lady", a 2012 single by Boyfriend
 "Dance Dance Dance", a song by Beth Anderson from the soundtrack of the 1983 film Scarface
 "Dance, Dance, Dance", a 1957 B-side by The Dells on "Why Do You Have to Go/Dance, Dance, Dance"
 "Dance, Dance, Dance", a 2008 song by Lykke Li from the album Youth Novels
 "Dance Dance Dance", a song on the Steve Miller Band album Fly Like an Eagle

Other
 Dance Dance Dance (German TV series), a German television series
 Dance Dance Dance (British TV series), a British television series
 Dance Dance Dance (novel), a 1988 novel by Haruki Murakami
 Dance, Dance, Dance: The Best of Chic, a 1999 album by Chic

See also
Dance, Dance (disambiguation)